Ivan Dodig and Marcelo Melo were the defending champions, but chose not to participate together. Melo played alongside Łukasz Kubot, but lost in the second round to Fabrice Martin and Édouard Roger-Vasselin. Dodig teamed up with Rohan Bopanna, but lost in the final to Pierre-Hugues Herbert and Nicolas Mahut, 4–6, 6–3, [6–10].

Seeds
All seeds received a bye into the second round.

Draw

Finals

Top half

Bottom half

References
Main Draw

Men's Doubles